Grover Cleveland Winn (January 3, 1886 – May 18, 1943) was an American lawyer and politician who served as speaker of the Alaska Territorial House of Representatives.

Early life and education
Winn was born Grover Cleveland Winn in Wiota, Wisconsin, in 1886. He received his law degree in 1910 from the University of Washington School of Law.

Career 
Winn practiced law in Juneau, Alaska, and served as a member of the Juneau School Board. Winn was a member of the Alaska Territorial House of Representatives from 1929 to 1933, serving as speaker from 1931 to 1933. He was a Republican.

Personal life 
His son, William, became a noted art dealer and critic in Juneau, Alaska. Winn died in 1943.

References

External links
 Grover Winn at 100 Years of Alaska's Legislature

1886 births
1943 deaths
Alaska lawyers
Republican Party members of the Alaska House of Representatives
Burials at Evergreen Cemetery (Juneau, Alaska)
Members of the Alaska Territorial Legislature
People from Wiota, Wisconsin
School board members in Alaska
Speakers of the Alaska House of Representatives
University of Washington School of Law alumni
20th-century American lawyers
20th-century American politicians